Ultrafast electron diffraction (UED), also known as femtosecond electron diffraction (FED), is a pump-probe experimental method based on the combination of optical pump-probe spectroscopy and electron diffraction.  UED provides information on the dynamical changes of the structure of materials. It is very similar to time resolved crystallography, but instead of using X-rays as the probe, it uses electrons. In the UED technique, a femtosecond (fs) laser optical pulse excites (pumps) a sample into an excited, usually non-equilibrium, state. The pump pulse may induce chemical, electronic or structural  transitions.  After a finite time interval, a fs electron pulse is incident upon the sample.  The electron pulse undergoes diffraction as a result of interacting with the sample.  The diffraction signal is, subsequently, detected by an electron counting instrument such as a CCD camera. Specifically, after the electron pulse diffracts from the sample, the scattered electrons will form a diffraction pattern (image) on a CCD camera.  This pattern contains structural information about the sample. By adjusting the time difference between the arrival (at the sample) of the pump and probe beams, one can obtain a series of diffraction patterns as a function of the various time differences.  The diffraction data series can be concatenated in order to produce a motion picture of the changes that occurred in the data. UED can provide a wealth of dynamics on charge carriers, atoms, and molecules.

History
The design of early ultrafast electron diffraction instruments was based on x-ray streak cameras, the first reported UED experiment demonstrating an electron pulse length of 100 ps.

Electron Pulse Production
The electron pulses are typically produced by the process of photoemission in which a fs optical pulse is directed toward a photocathode.  If the incident laser pulse has an appropriate energy, electrons will be ejected from the photocathode through a process known as photoemission. The electrons are subsequently accelerated to high energies, ranging from tens of kiloelectron-volts to several megaelectron-volts, using an electron gun.

Electron Pulse Compression
Generally, two methods are used in order to compress electron pulses in order to overcome pulsewidth expansion due to Coulomb repulsion.  Generating high-flux ultrashort electron beams has been relatively straightforward, but pulse duration below a picosecond proved extremely difficult due to space-charge effects. Space-charge interactions increase in severity with bunch charge and rapidly act to broaden the pulse duration, which has resulted in an apparently unavoidable trade-off between signal (bunch charge) and time-resolution in ultrafast electron diffraction (UED) experiments.  Radio-frequency (RF) compression has emerged has an leading method of reducing the pulse expansion in UED experiments, achieving temporal resolution well below 50 femtoseconds.
Shorter electron beams below 10 femtoseconds are ultimately required to probe the fastest dynamics
in solid state materials and observe gas phase molecular reactions.

Single shot

For studying irreversible process, a diffraction signal is obtained from a single electron bunch containing  or more particles.

Stroboscopic

Resolution
The resolution of an ultrafast electron diffraction apparatus can be characterized both in space and in time. Spatial resolution comes in two distinct parts: real space and reciprocal space. Real space resolution is determined by the physical size of the electron probe on the sample. A smaller physical probe size can allow experiments on crystals that cannot feasibly be grown in large sizes.

High reciprocal space resolution allows for the detection of Bragg diffraction spots that correspond to long periodicity phenomena. It can be calculated with the following equation:
,

Temporal resolution is primarily a function of the bunch length of the electrons and the relative timing jitters between the pump and probe.

Detectors

See also
Ahmed Zewail
R. J. Dwayne Miller
Time resolved crystallography

References

Sources
 

 
 

Laser applications
Diffraction